Eyüp Can Sağlık (born 1973 in Adana, Turkey) is a Turkish journalist and ex-editor-in-chief of the Turkish newspaper Radikal.

After graduating in Communications from Istanbul University in 1993, he earned a master's degree in American Foreign Policy and Middle East Relations in Center for Middle Eastern Studies at Harvard University in Cambridge, Massachusetts, United States.

He began his journalist career already in university years in 1994 and continued working for the major Turkish newspaper Zaman. Can transferred in 2004 to the newly established economics and business-oriented newspaper Referans becoming its editor-in-chief. When Referans merged with Radikal in 2010, Can became editor-in-chief of Radikal. On 21 June 2014, Eyüp Can resigned his post as editor-in-chief of Radikal. He continued to work in Doğan Media Group.   

Eyüp Can married in 2005 Turkish novelist Elif Şafak.

Eyüp Can has two children.

References
 Biography 

'.

1973 births
Living people
Harvard University alumni
People from Adana
Turkish journalists
Istanbul University alumni
Zaman (newspaper) people
Radikal (newspaper) people